Rast was a Tümen Prince of Moksha descent Founder of the Rast dynasty.Assassinated in May, 1531.

Biography
Rast was a member of Eastern party and supporter of Khan Safa Giray. He was assassinated during the Moscow supported coup d'etat in May, 1531 when pro-Muscovy Shahghali was planned to be enthroned in Kazan

Literature
The Complete Collection of Russian Chronicles, vols. IX-XIV, editions of 1863, 1918, 2000. Nikonov chronicle

External Links
Худяков Михаил Георгиевич. Очерки по истории Казанского ханства, Аврелия, Казань, 2004

See also
Mokshas
Tümen Princes
Tümen Principality

Notes

References

Moksha people
Lists of princes
Khanate of Kazan
History of Russia